The following is a partial list of the "D" codes for Medical Subject Headings (MeSH), as defined by the United States National Library of Medicine (NLM).

This list continues the information at List of MeSH codes (C23). Codes following these are found at List of MeSH codes (D02). For other MeSH codes, see List of MeSH codes.

The source for this content is the set of 2006 MeSH Trees from the NLM.

– inorganic chemicals

– acids

– acids, noncarboxylic
  – boric acids
  – borinic acids
  – boronic acids
  – carbonic acid
  – hydrobromic acid
  – hydrochloric acid
  – hydrofluoric acid
  – hydrogen cyanide
  – hydrogen sulfide
  – hypochlorous acid
  – nitric acid
  – nitrous acid
  – perchloric acid
  – periodic acid
  – phosphorus acids
  – phosphinic acids
  – phosphonic acids
  – phosphoric acids
  – phosphotungstic acid
  – phosphorous acids
  – silicic acid
  – sulfur acids
  – sulfinic acids
  – sulfonic acids
  – thiosulfonic acids
  – sulfuric acids
  – tetrathionic acid

– alkalies

– carbonates
  – lithium carbonate

– hydroxides
  – aluminum hydroxide
  – lye
  – sodium hydroxide

– aluminum compounds

– alum compounds

– aluminum hydroxide

– aluminum oxide
  – aluminum silicates
  – bentonite
  – kaolin
  – zeolites

– arsenicals

– arsenates

– arsenites

– barium compounds

– barium sulfate

– boron compounds

– boranes
  – borohydrides

– boric acids
  – borates

– borinic acids

– boronic acids

– bromine compounds

– bromates

– hydrobromic acid
  – bromides
  – cyanogen bromide

– cadmium compounds

– cadmium chloride

– calcium compounds

– calcium carbonate

– calcium chloride

– calcium citrate

– calcium, dietary

– calcium fluoride

– calcium hydroxide

– calcium phosphates
  – apatites
  – hydroxyapatites
  – durapatite
  – calcium pyrophosphate

– calcium sulfate

– carbon compounds, inorganic

– carbon dioxide
  – dry ice

– carbon disulfide

– carbon monoxide

– carbonic acid
  – carbonates
  – bicarbonates
  – sodium bicarbonate
  – calcium carbonate
  – lithium carbonate

– chlorine compounds

– chlorates

– cisplatin

– hydrochloric acid
  – chlorides
  – ammonium chloride
  – cadmium chloride
  – calcium chloride
  – lithium chloride
  – magnesium chloride
  – mercuric chloride
  – potassium chloride
  – sodium chloride

– hypochlorous acid
  – sodium hypochlorite

– perchloric acid

– ruthenium red

– chromium compounds

– chromates
  – potassium dichromate

– chromium alloys
  – vitallium

– electrolytes

– ions
  – anions
  – arsenates
  – arsenites
  – borates
  – bromates
  – bromides
  – carbonates
  – bicarbonates
  – chlorates
  – chlorides
  – chromates
  – cyanides
  – ferricyanides
  – nitroprusside
  – ferrocyanides
  – fluorides
  – hydroxides
  – hydroxyl radical
  – iodates
  – iodides
  – nitrates
  – nitrites
  – oxides
  – peroxides
  – hydrogen peroxide
  – superoxides
  – phosphates
  – polyphosphates
  – diphosphates
  – phosphites
  – sulfates
  – thiosulfates
  – sulfides
  – disulfides
  – cystine
  – sulfites
  – dithionite
  – vanadates
  – cations
  – cations, divalent
  – cations, monovalent
  – protons

– elements

– actinoid series elements
  – actinium
  – americium
  – berkelium
  – californium
  – curium
  – einsteinium
  – fermium
  – lawrencium
  – mendelevium
  – neptunium
  – nobelium
  – plutonium
  – protactinium
  – thorium
  – uranium

– arsenic

– boron

– carbon
  – charcoal
  – diamond
  – fullerenes
  – nanotubes, carbon
  – graphite

– chalcogens
  – oxygen
  – polonium
  – selenium
  – sulfur
  – tellurium

– elements, radioactive
  – actinoid series elements
  – actinium
  – americium
  – berkelium
  – californium
  – curium
  – einsteinium
  – fermium
  – lawrencium
  – mendelevium
  – neptunium
  – nobelium
  – plutonium
  – protactinium
  – thorium
  – uranium
  – astatine
  – francium
  – polonium
  – promethium
  – radium
  – radon
  – radon daughters
  – technetium

– halogens
  – astatine
  – bromine
  – chlorine
  – fluorine
  – iodine

– hydrogen

– lanthanoid series elements
  – cerium
  – dysprosium
  – erbium
  – europium
  – gadolinium
  – holmium
  – lanthanum
  – lutetium
  – neodymium
  – praseodymium
  – promethium
  – samarium
  – terbium
  – thulium
  – ytterbium

– metals, alkali
  – cesium
  – francium
  – lithium
  – potassium
  – rubidium
  – sodium

– metals, alkaline earth
  – barium
  – beryllium
  – calcium
  – magnesium
  – radium
  – strontium

– metals, heavy
  – actinium
  – americium
  – antimony
  – barium
  – berkelium
  – bismuth
  – cadmium
  – californium
  – cesium
  – chromium
  – cobalt
  – copper
  – curium
  – einsteinium
  – fermium
  – francium
  – gallium
  – germanium
  – gold
  – hafnium
  – indium
  – iridium
  – iron
  – lawrencium
  – lead
  – manganese
  – mendelevium
  – mercury
  – molybdenum
  – neptunium
  – nickel
  – niobium
  – nobelium
  – osmium
  – palladium
  – platinum
  – plutonium
  – protactinium
  – radium
  – rhenium
  – rhodium
  – rubidium
  – ruthenium
  – silver
  – strontium
  – tantalum
  – technetium
  – thallium
  – thorium
  – tin
  – tungsten
  – uranium
  – vanadium
  – zinc
  – zirconium

– metals, light
  – aluminum
  – beryllium
  – magnesium
  – titanium

– metals, rare earth
  – lanthanoid series elements
  – cerium
  – dysprosium
  – erbium
  – europium
  – gadolinium
  – holmium
  – lanthanum
  – lutetium
  – neodymium
  – praseodymium
  – promethium
  – samarium
  – terbium
  – thulium
  – ytterbium
  – scandium
  – yttrium

– nitrogen

– noble gases
  – argon
  – helium
  – krypton
  – neon
  – radon
  – xenon

– phosphorus

– silicon

– transition elements
  – cadmium
  – chromium
  – cobalt
  – copper
  – gold
  – hafnium
  – iridium
  – iron
  – lawrencium
  – lutetium
  – manganese
  – mercury
  – molybdenum
  – nickel
  – niobium
  – osmium
  – palladium
  – platinum
  – rhenium
  – rhodium
  – ruthenium
  – scandium
  – silver
  – tantalum
  – technetium
  – titanium
  – tungsten
  – vanadium
  – yttrium
  – zinc
  – zirconium

– fluorine compounds

– hydrofluoric acid
  – fluorides
  – calcium fluoride
  – fluorides, topical
  – sodium fluoride
  – acidulated phosphate fluoride
  – sulfur hexafluoride
  – tin fluorides

– free radicals

– nitric oxide

– reactive oxygen species
  – hydroxyl radical
  – hypochlorous acid
  – peroxides
  – hydrogen peroxide
  – superoxides
  – singlet oxygen
  – superoxides

– gases

– ammonia

– carbon dioxide

– carbon monoxide

– chlorine

– hydrogen

– hydrogen sulfide

– nitrogen

– nitrogen oxides
  – nitrogen dioxide
  – nitrous oxide

– noble gases
  – argon
  – helium
  – krypton
  – neon
  – radon
  – radon daughters
  – xenon

– oxygen
  – ozone

– sulfur dioxide

– sulfur hexafluoride

– gold compounds

– gold alloys

– gold colloid
  – gold colloid, radioactive

– gold sodium thiosulfate

– hydrogen

– deuterium
  – deuterium oxide

– protons

– tritium

– hydroxides

– aluminum hydroxide

– calcium hydroxide

– hydroxyl radical

– lye

– magnesium hydroxide

– sodium hydroxide

– water
  – deuterium oxide

– iodine compounds

– iodates

– iodides
  – potassium iodide
  – sodium iodide

– periodic acid

– iron compounds

– ferric compounds
  – ferricyanides
  – nitroprusside

– ferrous compounds
  – ferrocyanides

– iron, dietary

– steel
  – stainless steel

– isotopes

– calcium isotopes
  – calcium radioisotopes

– carbon isotopes
  – carbon radioisotopes

– cerium isotopes
  – cerium radioisotopes

– cesium isotopes
  – cesium radioisotopes

– chromium isotopes
  – chromium radioisotopes

– cobalt isotopes
  – cobalt radioisotopes

– deuterium

– gallium isotopes
  – gallium radioisotopes

– gold isotopes
  – gold radioisotopes
  – gold colloid, radioactive

– iodine isotopes
  – iodine radioisotopes
  – serum albumin, radio-iodinated

– iron isotopes
  – iron radioisotopes

– mercury isotopes
  – mercury radioisotopes

– nitrogen isotopes
  – nitrogen radioisotopes

– oxygen isotopes
  – oxygen radioisotopes

– phosphorus isotopes
  – phosphorus radioisotopes

– potassium isotopes
  – potassium radioisotopes

– radioisotopes
  – barium radioisotopes
  – bromine radioisotopes
  – cadmium radioisotopes
  – calcium radioisotopes
  – carbon radioisotopes
  – cerium radioisotopes
  – cesium radioisotopes
  – chromium radioisotopes
  – cobalt radioisotopes
  – copper radioisotopes
  – fluorine radioisotopes
  – gallium radioisotopes
  – gold radioisotopes
  – gold colloid, radioactive
  – indium radioisotopes
  – iodine radioisotopes
  – serum albumin, radio-iodinated
  – iridium radioisotopes
  – iron radioisotopes
  – krypton radioisotopes
  – lead radioisotopes
  – mercury radioisotopes
  – nitrogen radioisotopes
  – oxygen radioisotopes
  – phosphorus radioisotopes
  – potassium radioisotopes
  – radioactive tracers
  – rubidium radioisotopes
  – ruthenium radioisotopes
  – selenium radioisotopes
  – sodium radioisotopes
  – strontium radioisotopes
  – sulfur radioisotopes
  – thallium radioisotopes
  – tin radioisotopes
  – tritium
  – xenon radioisotopes
  – yttrium radioisotopes
  – zinc radioisotopes

– sodium isotopes
  – sodium radioisotopes

– strontium isotopes
  – strontium radioisotopes

– sulfur isotopes
  – sulfur radioisotopes

– xenon isotopes
  – xenon radioisotopes

– yttrium isotopes
  – yttrium radioisotopes

– zinc isotopes
  – zinc radioisotopes

– lithium compounds

– lithium carbonate

– lithium chloride

– magnesium compounds

– magnesium chloride

– magnesium hydroxide

– magnesium oxide

– magnesium silicates
  – asbestos, amosite
  – asbestos, serpentine
  – talc

– magnesium sulfate

– manganese compounds

– potassium permanganate

– mercury compounds

– mercuric chloride

– metals

– actinoid series elements
  – actinium
  – americium
  – berkelium
  – californium
  – curium
  – einsteinium
  – fermium
  – lawrencium
  – mendelevium
  – neptunium
  – nobelium
  – plutonium
  – protactinium
  – thorium
  – uranium

– alloys
  – chromium alloys
  – vitallium
  – gold alloys
  – metal ceramic alloys
  – cermet cements
  – steel
  – stainless steel

– metals, alkali
  – cesium
  – francium
  – lithium
  – potassium
  – rubidium
  – sodium

– metals, alkaline earth
  – barium
  – calcium
  – radium
  – strontium

– metals, heavy
  – actinium
  – americium
  – antimony
  – barium
  – berkelium
  – bismuth
  – cadmium
  – californium
  – cesium
  – chromium
  – cobalt
  – copper
  – curium
  – einsteinium
  – fermium
  – francium
  – gallium
  – germanium
  – gold
  – hafnium
  – indium
  – iridium
  – iron
  – lawrencium
  – lead
  – manganese
  – mendelevium
  – mercury
  – molybdenum
  – neptunium
  – nickel
  – niobium
  – nobelium
  – osmium
  – palladium
  – platinum
  – plutonium
  – protactinium
  – radium
  – rhenium
  – rhodium
  – rubidium
  – ruthenium
  – silver
  – strontium
  – tantalum
  – technetium
  – thallium
  – thorium
  – tin
  – tungsten
  – uranium
  – vanadium
  – zinc
  – zirconium

– metals, light
  – aluminum
  – beryllium
  – magnesium
  – titanium

– metals, rare earth
  – lanthanoid series elements
  – cerium
  – dysprosium
  – erbium
  – europium
  – gadolinium
  – holmium
  – lanthanum
  – lutetium
  – neodymium
  – praseodymium
  – promethium
  – samarium
  – terbium
  – thulium
  – ytterbium
  – scandium
  – yttrium

– minerals

– apatites
  – hydroxyapatites
  – durapatite

– calcium carbonate

– calcium sulfate

– ferrosoferric oxide

– graphite

– mineral fibers

– selenium

– silicates
  – aluminum silicates
  – bentonite
  – kaolin
  – zeolites
  – asbestos
  – asbestos, amphibole
  – asbestos, amosite
  – asbestos, crocidolite
  – asbestos, serpentine
  – magnesium silicates
  – asbestos, amosite
  – asbestos, serpentine
  – talc

– silicon dioxide
  – diatomaceous earth
  – quartz

– nitrogen compounds

– ammonia

– quaternary ammonium compounds
  – ammonium chloride
  – ammonium sulfate
  – hydroxylamine

– azides
  – sodium azide

– cisplatin

– cyanogen bromide

– hydrogen cyanide
  – cyanides
  – cyanamide
  – ferricyanides
  – nitroprusside
  – ferrocyanides
  – potassium cyanide
  – sodium cyanide

– nitric acid
  – nitrates
  – silver nitrate
  – uranyl nitrate

– nitrogen oxides
  – nitric oxide
  – nitrogen dioxide
  – nitrous oxide

– nitrous acid
  – nitrites
  – sodium nitrite
  – peroxynitrous acid

– reactive nitrogen species
  – nitric oxide
  – peroxynitrous acid

– ruthenium red

– osmium compounds

– osmium tetroxide

– oxygen compounds

– oxides
  – aluminum oxide
  – aluminum silicates
  – bentonite
  – kaolin
  – zeolites
  – carbon dioxide
  – dry ice
  – carbon monoxide
  – hypochlorous acid
  – sodium hypochlorite
  – magnesium oxide
  – nitrogen oxides
  – nitric oxide
  – nitrogen dioxide
  – nitrous oxide
  – osmium tetroxide
  – peroxides
  – hydrogen peroxide
  – superoxides
  – silicon dioxide
  – diatomaceous earth
  – quartz
  – sulfur oxides
  – sulfur dioxide
  – thorium dioxide
  – water
  – zinc oxide

– reactive oxygen species

– phosphorus compounds

– phosphines

– phosphoranes

– phosphorus acids
  – phosphinic acids
  – phosphonic acids
  – phosphoric acids
  – phosphates
  – acidulated phosphate fluoride
  – calcium phosphates
  – apatites
  – hydroxyapatites
  – durapatite
  – calcium pyrophosphate
  – polyphosphates
  – diphosphates
  – calcium pyrophosphate
  – technetium tc 99m pyrophosphate
  – tin polyphosphates
  – phosphotungstic acid
  – phosphorous acids
  – phosphites

– phosphorus, dietary

– platinum compounds

– cisplatin

– potassium compounds

– potassium chloride

– potassium cyanide

– potassium dichromate

– potassium, dietary

– potassium iodide

– potassium permanganate

– ruthenium compounds

– ruthenium red

– salts

– selenium compounds

– selenious acid

– sodium selenite

– silicon compounds

– silanes

– silicon dioxide
  – diatomaceous earth
  – quartz
  – silicic acid
  – silicates
  – aluminum silicates
  – bentonite
  – kaolin
  – zeolites
  – asbestos
  – asbestos, amphibole
  – asbestos, amosite
  – asbestos, crocidolite
  – asbestos, serpentine
  – magnesium silicates
  – asbestos, amosite
  – asbestos, serpentine
  – talc

– siloxanes

– silver compounds

– silver nitrate

– sodium compounds

– gold sodium thiosulfate

– sodium azide

– sodium bicarbonate

– sodium chloride
  – sodium chloride, dietary

– sodium cyanide

– sodium, dietary
  – sodium chloride, dietary

– sodium fluoride
  – acidulated phosphate fluoride

– sodium hydroxide

– sodium hypochlorite

– sodium iodide

– sodium nitrite

– sodium selenite

– sulfur compounds

– hydrogen sulfide
  – sulfides
  – disulfides
  – carbon disulfide
  – cystine

– sulfites
  – dithionite

– sulfur acids
  – sulfinic acids
  – sulfonic acids
  – thiosulfonic acids
  – sulfuric acids
  – sulfates
  – alum compounds
  – ammonium sulfate
  – barium sulfate
  – calcium sulfate
  – copper sulfate
  – magnesium sulfate
  – thiosulfates
  – gold sodium thiosulfate
  – zinc sulfate
  – tetrathionic acid

– sulfur hexafluoride

– sulfur oxides
  – sulfur dioxide

– technetium tc 99m sulfur colloid

– technetium compounds

– sodium pertechnetate tc 99m

– technetium tc 99m pyrophosphate

– technetium tc 99m sulfur colloid

– thorium compounds

– thorium dioxide

– tin compounds

– tin fluorides

– tin polyphosphates

– tungsten compounds

– phosphotungstic acid

– uranium compounds

– uranyl nitrate

– vanadium compounds

– vanadates

– zinc compounds

– zinc oxide

– zinc sulfate

The list continues at List of MeSH codes (D02).

D01